Alberto Corvo (born 14 April 1963) is a former Italian middle-distance runner who was 6th in the 1500 m at the World Athletics Indoor Championships in 1985.

Achievements

See also
 Italy at the World Athletics Indoor Championships

References

External links
 

1963 births
Living people
Italian male middle-distance runners
Sportspeople from the Province of Latina
Athletics competitors of Fiamme Gialle
People from Latina, Lazio